Lily Sinei Mulivai (born 3 August 1990) is a New Zealand-Samoan cricketer who plays for Northern Districts and Samoa.

Mulivai was born in Auckland and is the younger sister of Samoan cricketer Faasao Mulivai.

International career
Mulivai was selected for the Samoa one day international squad for the 2010 series against Fiji. She won gold with the women's team at the 2015 and 2019 Pacific Games.

References

External links

1990 births
Living people
New Zealand sportspeople of Samoan descent
Northern Districts women cricketers
Cricketers from Auckland
Samoan women cricketers